Piłsudski's colonels, or the colonels' regime (in Polish called simply "the colonels"), dominated the government of the Second Polish Republic from 1926 to 1939.  In some contexts, the term refers primarily to the final period (1935–1939), which followed the death of their mentor and patron, Józef Piłsudski.

History
Close allies of Józef Piłsudski, most of "the colonels" had served as officers in the Polish Legions and Polish Military Organisation (POW), and in the Polish Army (particularly during the Polish–Soviet War of 1919–1920, prior to Piłsudski's 1923 resignation as Chief of the Polish General Staff).  They had held key, if not necessarily the highest, military ranks during Piłsudski's May 1926 coup d'état.

Later they became important figures in Piłsudski's Sanation movement and ministers in several governments. After the BBWR's 1930 electoral victory (the "Brest elections"), Piłsudski left most internal matters in the hands of his "colonels", while himself concentrating on military and foreign affairs.

The "colonels" included Józef Beck, Janusz Jędrzejewicz, Wacław Jędrzejewicz, Adam Koc, Leon Kozłowski, Ignacy Matuszewski, Bronisław Pieracki, Aleksander Prystor, Adam Skwarczyński, Walery Sławek, and Kazimierz Świtalski.

One can divide the colonels' régime into three periods: 1926–1929, 1930–1935 and 1935–1939.

During the first period, after the May 1926 coup, the colonels (and Sanation generally) consolidated their control over the government.

The second period, following the 1930 "Brest elections", saw the colonels' regime under Piłsudski's guidance, with power exercised by his allies and friends such as Walery Slawek and Aleksander Prystor, both of whom had known Piłsudski since 1905 and had served in the Combat Organization of the Polish Socialist Party before World War I.

After Piłsudski's death (1935), the hardliner "colonels", led by Walery Sławek, lost influence to the Castle faction of Ignacy Mościcki and Edward Rydz-Śmigły. Nevertheless, the "colonels' regime" and Sanation still dominated the Polish government from 1935 to the German invasion of Poland, in September 1939. Some scholars draw a distinction between the "Piłsudski period" (1926–35) and the "colonels' period, proper" (1935–39).

From 1937, the colonels' new political front would be the Camp of National Unity (OZON). In that last period, the Polish government, a "dictatorship without a dictator", to bolster its popular support, paradoxically adopted some of the nationalistic anti-minority policies that had been opposed by Piłsudski and advocated by his most vocal adversaries, the National Democrats.

See also
Józef Piłsudski's cult of personality
Military dictatorship
Piłsudskiite

References

Sources
Wereszycki, H. (1968). "Towards a Total Dictatorship (1931-1939)". In History of Poland, Warsaw, 1968, pp. 689–709.

Second Polish Republic
Military history of Poland
Political history of Poland
Józef Piłsudski